Laureano is a male name and a surname, both deriving from . Alternate spelling include Laurean (Romania, Spain, Italy, Portugal, Puerto Rico, Brazil, France, Mexico, Yugoslavia) and Laurian (Romania, Italy, France).

People

Given names
Laureano Barrau, a Spanish impressionist painter
Laureano Fuentes, wrote the first opera to be composed on the island (Cuba), La hija de Jéfe (the Chief's daughter)
Laureano Gómez, the President of Colombia from 1950 to 1953
Laureano Ibarra, an American retired competitive pair skate
Laureano López Rodó, Spanish lawyer and politician
Laureano Leone, a former politician in Ontario, Canada
Laureano Olivares, a Venezuelan film and television actor best known for his role in Elia Schneider's movie Sicario at the age of 16
Laureano Pineda, the 26th and 29th President (then called Supreme Director) of Nicaragua from 5 May to 11 August 1851, as dissident from 4 August, and from 11 November 1851 to 1 April 1853
 Laureano Ramírez, a retired Dominican boxer, who represented his native country at the 1984 Summer Olympics in Los Angeles in the Men's Flyweight division
 Laurean Rugambwa, was the first modern African Cardinal of the Roman Catholic Church
Laureano Sanabria Ruiz, a.k.a. Laure, is a Spanish professional footballer who currently plays for Deportivo de La Coruña, mainly as a right back
Laureano Tombolini, an unattached Argentine football goalkeeper who plays for Instituto
Laureano de Torres y Ayala, colonial governor of Cuba and Spanish Florida
 Laureano Vallenilla Lanz, a Venezuelan intellectual and sociologist
 August Treboniu Laurian, a Transylvanian Romanian politician, historian and linguist

Surnames
Gustavo Laureano, a Puerto Rican guitarist and composer, better known for being the lead singer of the band La Secta AllStar
José Laureano, a Puerto Rican professional boxer
Manny Laureano, the Principal Trumpet of the Minnesota Orchestra, as well as the Co-Artistic Director of the Minnesota Youth Symphonies
Marta Laureano, most notable for her involvement in a controversially ruled child custody battle
Napoleão Laureano, a Brazilian cancer specialist
Ramón Laureano, a Dominican professional baseball outfielder for the Oakland Athletics
Ricky Laureano, a Puerto Rican musician most known for being the guitarist and one of the main songwriters of the Rock en Español band Fiel a la Vega
Tony Laureano, an extreme metal drummer, originally from Puerto Rico

See also
Laura (disambiguation)
Lauren (disambiguation)
Lauriano, a comune in the Province of Turin
Lawrence of Rome

Italian masculine given names
Spanish masculine given names